Zemtsov may refer to:
Mikhail Zemtsov (1688-1743), Russian architect
25094 Zemtsov, an asteroid